The Secret is a 1990 Italian drama film directed by Francesco Maselli. It was entered into the 40th Berlin International Film Festival.

Cast
 Nastassja Kinski as Lucia
 Stefano Dionisi as Carlo
 Franco Citti as Franco
 Chiara Caselli as Lilli
 Alessandra Marson
 Franca Scagnetti
 Raffaela Davi
 Enzo Saturini
 Antonio de Giorgi
 Michela Bruni
 Luigi Diberti
 Maria Giovanna Delfino

References

External links

1990 films
1990s Italian-language films
1990 drama films
Films directed by Francesco Maselli
Italian drama films
1990s Italian films